Mallobathra tonnoiri is a moth of the family Psychidae. This species is endemic to New Zealand.

Taxonomy
This species was first described by Alfred Philpott in 1927 using a male specimen collected by Mr A. Tonnoir at Lake Brunner in December. The male holotype specimen is held at the Canterbury Museum.

Description
Philpott described this species as follows:

References 

Moths described in 1927
Moths of New Zealand
Psychidae
Endemic fauna of New Zealand
Taxa named by Alfred Philpott
Endemic moths of New Zealand